Tereza Kučerová (born 5 May 1964) is a Czech artist. Her parents are Věra Chytilová and Jaroslav Kučera.

During her career she has worked in a variety of fields, including graphic art, painting, and design. As a costume designer she has been associated with a number of films, and she has created several cartoons, which have been seen at numerous animation festivals. She has exhibited her work in the Czech Republic. Kučerová joined the Hollar Association of Czech Graphic Artists in 2016. Two 1993 lithographs in color, Pani B/Mrs. B and Rust/Growth, are owned by the National Gallery of Art.

References

1964 births
Living people
Czech printmakers
Women printmakers
Czech animators
Czech women animators
Czech costume designers
Women costume designers
20th-century Czech artists
20th-century printmakers
20th-century Czech women artists
21st-century Czech artists
21st-century printmakers
21st-century Czech women artists
Artists from Prague
Academy of Arts, Architecture and Design in Prague alumni